The Parliament of the Republic of Moldova (2009–2010) had 101 seats and was dominated by the Alliance for European Integration (AIE).

Leadership 

The first session of Moldova's parliament was scheduled for August 28, 2009, one day short of the deadline for the body to convene. On August 28, 2009, the Alliance for European Integration (AIE) elected Mihai Ghimpu as the Speaker of the Moldovan Parliament.

The elected deputies 

 For an updated list of deputies elected in July 2009, please see July 2009 Moldovan parliamentary election.

References

2009 in Moldova
2010 in Moldova
Government of Moldova
2009-2010
Alliance for European Integration
Main